John Beard (born 1948) is an American retired news anchor and actor.

Early life and career
Beard was born in St. Pauls, North Carolina. He served as a Navy Corpsman with the Marines and graduated from East Carolina University. After school, he worked for television stations WITN-TV in Washington, North Carolina (1972 to 1976), WXII-TV in Winston-Salem (1976 to 1977) and, WIVB-TV in Buffalo (1977 to 1981).

KNBC-TV (1981–1993) 
From 1981 to 1993, Beard was anchor at KNBC-TV.  Beard's co-anchors at KNBC included Tritia Toyota, Kristie Wilde, Kelly Lange and Linda Alvarez.  He also anchored NBC News Digest segments during primetime in the Pacific Time Zone.  Beard departed KNBC in November 1993 and joined KTTV the following month.  Among the reasons for Beard's departure was his refusal to read misleading news teases and celebrity stories (particularly regarding pop singer Michael Jackson).  Beard was the 4 PM anchor of the Channel 4 News at the time of his departure and was replaced by former KABC-TV personality Chuck Henry.

Held at gunpoint 
On August 20, 1987, Gary Stollman—the son of former KNBC pharmacy specialist Max Stollman—went onto the news set and demanded consumer advocate David Horowitz read a manifesto at gunpoint. Horowitz obliged and read various statements, including that Stollman's father was "a double created by the Central Intelligence Agency and alien forces", along with numerous other conspiratorial allegations against the U.S. government. Once Horowitz finished reading, Stollman identified the weapon as an unloaded BB gun and set it down on the desk; Beard reached over and grabbed the weapon as police entered the scene and arrested Stollman. Stollman pleaded guilty to one misdemeanor count of false imprisonment, with a felony charge dismissed.

KTTV (1993–2007) 
From December 1993 until September 2007, he anchored, with Christine Devine, the 10 PM newscast at KTTV in Los Angeles. KNBC management at the time let him out of his contract to go to a "lesser" station, but would not release him to go to channel 2 (KCBS) or channel 7 (KABC), the other two network owned and operated stations in Los Angeles with 11 PM newscasts. The Fox owned-and-operated was acceptable because its 10 PM newscast would not compete against KNBC and Beard was considered a great reader by news directors and station general management.

Departure 
Beard left KTTV in December 2007. According to his personal website, he was fired despite the highest ratings in the station's history following years of increasing editorial disagreements with station management, whose audience market research was steering it toward ever more unsubstantial journalism and celebrity fluff.  Beard was replaced by former KTLA Morning News anchor Carlos Amezcua.

WGRZ (2009–2018) 
In 2009, Beard returned to Buffalo and began anchoring for Channel 2 News Daybreak and Midday on WGRZ, an NBC affiliate owned by Tegna Inc. While anchor, WGRZ's morning newscast, Daybreak vaulted into first place in Buffalo's Nielsen ratings.  On November 1, 2016 it was announced that John Beard would be leaving WGRZ at the end of the year. Beard ultimately stayed over a year longer, with his final newscast airing January 18, 2018.

Acting work 
He has appeared as himself and newscaster roles in television series including the 1994 animated series Spider-Man, 24, and Arrested Development (on which he made twenty-four appearances as himself, including the fourth and fifth seasons, which were filmed after he relocated to Buffalo).

References

External links
 

1945 births
Living people
East Carolina University alumni
Television anchors from Los Angeles
Military personnel from North Carolina
People from St. Pauls, North Carolina